Nikita Nikolayevich (born 11 September 1997) is a Belarusian professional footballer who plays for NK Dugopolje as a midfielder.

References

External links 
 
 Profile at FC Minsk website
 

1997 births
Living people
Belarusian footballers
Association football midfielders
Belarusian expatriate footballers
Expatriate footballers in Bulgaria
FC Minsk players
FC Torpedo-BelAZ Zhodino players
PFC Slavia Sofia players